The Eastover–Addison Road Line, designated Route P12, is a daily bus route operated by the Washington Metropolitan Area Transit Authority between the Addison Road station of the Blue & Silver Lines of the Washington Metro and Eastover Shopping Center in Forest Heights, Maryland. The line operates every 12 minutes between 7AM and 9PM and 30 minutes after 9PM. P12 trips are roughly 60 minutes long.

Background
Route P12 operates daily between Addison Road station and Eastover Shopping Center via Southern Avenue station and Suitland station. The line mostly provide service along Addison Road, Silver Hill Road, Iverson Street connecting many neighborhoods to various Metrorail stations. The P12 operates every 12 minutes between 7AM and 9PM and 30 minutes after 9PM.

Route P12 currently operates out of Landover division.

P12 Stops

History
Route P12 was created as a brand new bus route by the WM&A Bus Company in 1965, to operate as part of the District Heights-Silver Hill Road Line between the Eastover Shopping Center in Forest Heights, Maryland and the intersection of Shady Glen Drive and Central Avenue along Walker Mill Road. P12 was eventually converted into a WMATA Metrobus Route on February 4, 1973 when WMATA acquired all four bus companies that operated throughout the Washington D.C. Metropolitan Area and merged them to form its own Metrobus System.

On December 3, 1978, route P12 was extended from its original terminus at the intersection of Shady Glen Drive & Central Avenue to Deanwood station beginning on December 3, 1978. The name of the P12 was also changed to the Eastover–Deanwood Line.

On January 4, 1981 two months after the Addison Road station opened, route P12 discontinued service to Deanwood station and instead terminate at Addison Road station. Route P14 and R12 would replace the P12 between Deanwood and Addison Road stations operating along the former P12 routing. The only changes route P12 would also have was that the P12 would operate along Central Avenue to Shady Glen Drive, then turn onto Shady Glen Drive to the Eastover Shopping Center and vice versa to Addison Road. The line was then renamed the Eastover–Addison Road Line.

On January 13, 2001 when both Suitland and Southern Avenue stations opened, P12 went through a minor rerouting change to divert to Suitland and Southern Avenue stations.

In 2014, it was proposed for the P12 and V12 to swap routings between Addison Road station and the intersection of Addison Road and Walker Mill Road which will provide a more direct route for the P12 as the V12 is focused to become a neighborhood focused route. Also P12 was also proposed to terminate only at Southern Avenue station with a brand new P10 service operating between Southern Avenue and Eastover Shopping Center but discontinue service at United Medical Center with alternative service provided by the A2, W2, and W3.

This was because discontinuing service through United Medical Center property will save time and increase reliability, since buses will make fewer turns and will no longer get stuck behind illegally parked vehicles at the hospital entrance, swapping P12 and V12 routing on Wheeler Road and Shady Glen Drive will provide a more direct route for the P12 as the V12 is already designed to be a more neighborhood-focused service, and splitting the P12 route at Southern Avenue Station will increase reliability and on time performance plus also provides the flexibility to focus future resources on the portions of the line with the highest demand. According to Performance Measures, only 11% of passengers on the route travel through Southern Avenue Station, the route averages approximately 52 passengers per hour on weekday, and 41 passengers per hour on Saturdays and Sundays north of Southern Avenue Station, and the route averages approximately 58 passengers per hour of weekdays, 54 passengers per hour on Saturdays and 56 passengers per hour on Sundays south of Southern Avenue Station.

On June 21, 2015, routes P12 and V12 swapped its routing between the intersection of Addison Road and Walker Mill Road and Addison Road station. Route P12 would operate along Addison Road while route V12 would operate along Shady Glen Drive, Walker Mill Road, and Central Avenue. Also, route P12 discontinue service into United Medical Center and instead serve bus stops along Southern Avenue. As a result of these changes, route P12 also became a more direct route while route V12 a neighborhood-focused route which was WMATA's "Better Bus Service" initiative program's goal.

During the COVID-19 pandemic, route P12 operated on its Saturday supplemental schedule beginning on March 16, 2020. It however began operating on its Sunday service on March 18, 2020. Weekend service was also reduced to operate every 30 munutes. Its regular service was restored on August 23, 2020.

On September 5, 2021, service was increased to operate every 12 minutes daily between 7 a.m. to 9 p.m.

Incidents
On April 29, 2022, a person was stabbed to death after he got into an altercation with another person on board a P12 bus near Southview Court and Southview Drive in Oxon Hill. The suspect was charged with second-degree murder on May 4, 2022.

References

P12